Western Australia an official handbook for The Information of Commercial Men, Migrants, and Tourists was a government publication that was produced by the government in the 1890s and 1920s in Western Australia.

1891/1892 edition
1900 edition, produced for the Paris Exposition
1912 edition
1925 edition
The contents were arranged:

 Physical features and history
 State's awakening
 Western Australia today
 Climate
 Land and its characteristics
 Growth of land settlement
 Agriculture generally
 Wheat farming
 Dairying and allied industries
 Fruit growing
 Viticulture and wine-making
 Pastoral
 Forestry
 Mining
 Fish and fisheries
 Pearls and pearlshell
 Our great North-West
 Secondary industries
 Water conservation
 Perth the capital city
 Ports, Communication by land water and air
 Education
 Western Australia for the migrant
 Tourist resorts
 Aboriginals
 Wildflowers

Similar titles in the same era included non governmental items with very close sounding items:

A handbook to Western Australia and its gold-fields : being a guide to the resources (agricultural, mineral and miscellaneous) of the colony, and a collection of hints to the intending immigrant

References 

Books about Western Australia
Western Australia an official handbook
Government publications